Paropta paradoxus is a species of moth of the family Cossidae. It is found on Cyprus and Rhodes and in Lebanon, Syria, Egypt, Saudi Arabia, Israel, Iran and Jordan.

The wingspan is about 33 mm. Adults are on wing from December to February in Israel.

The larvae have been recorded feeding on Vitis species, Ficus carica, Ficus pseudosycramorus, Acacia arabica, Cercis siliquastrum and Crataegus species. Young larvae feed under loose bark, penetrating the wood through dried stubs of pruned canes. They create galleries along the axes of stems and branches. Alternatively, larvae may also develop under dry bark. The species overwinters as an immature or mature larva. Pupation usually takes place in the larval galleries.

Subspecies
Paropta paradoxus paradoxus
Paropta paradoxus kathikas Yakovlev & Lewandowski, 2007 (Cyprus)

References

Moths described in 1851
Cossinae
Moths of Europe
Moths of Asia